The 2013 American Express – TED Open was a professional tennis tournament played on hard courts. It was the 26th edition of the tournament which was part of the 2013 ATP Challenger Tour. It took place in Istanbul, Turkey between 9 and 15 September 2013.

Singles main-draw entrants

Seeds

 1 Rankings are as of August 26, 2013.

Other entrants
The following players received wildcards into the singles main draw:
  Tuna Altuna
  Barış Ergüden
  Peter Gojowczyk
  Anıl Yüksel

The following players received entry into the singles main draw as an alternate:
  Nikoloz Basilashvili

The following players received entry from the qualifying draw:
  David Rice
  Joshua Milton
  Egor Gerasimov
  Denis Matsukevich

Champions

Singles

  Mikhail Kukushkin def.  Illya Marchenko, 6–3, 6–3

Doubles

  Jamie Delgado /  Jordan Kerr def.  James Cluskey /  Adrián Menéndez Maceiras, 6–3, 6–2

External links
Official Website

American Express - TED Open
PTT İstanbul Cup
PTT